Quentin Blake Centre for Illustration (formerly House of Illustration) is the only public arts organisation in the UK dedicated to illustration. It was founded by Quentin Blake in 2002 and is based in London, England. From 2014 to 2020, it was located at 2 Granary Square in the London Borough of Camden and called House of Illustration.

In July 2020 it was announced that House of Illustration at Granary Square would close and that the organisation would relocate to industrial heritage site New River Head in the Clerkenwell area in the London Borough of Islington. The site's 18th- and 19th-century buildings will be restored according to a scheme by Tim Ronalds Architects as part of a £12mn capital campaign. The site will open in 2024 and will be named Quentin Blake Centre for Illustration. It will be home to exhibition galleries, education studios, events space, a shop and a café  Until the site opens, the organisation is touring exhibitions of original illustration, hosting creative workshops and working with schools and community groups in Islington. A 2021 project in collaboration with The Peel Institute and London Metropolitan Archives was called Clerkenwell: Now and Then, and resulted in an alternative guide to Islington written and illustrated by local residents.

Previous exhibitions have shown a diverse range of illustration, including advertisements, animation, comic books and manga, children's literature, propaganda, political cartoons, scientific illustration and fashion design. Subjects have included Cuban graphic design, feminist comics and retrospectives of artists including Enid Marx, Tom of Finland and Jacqueline Ayer.

References

External links
 Quentin Blake Centre for Illustration - official site

Art museums and galleries in London
Buildings and structures in the London Borough of Camden
Tourist attractions in the London Borough of Camden
Illustration
2014 establishments in England
Museums established in 2014